Tschabalala Self (born 1990) is an American artist best known for her depictions of Black female figures using paint, fabric, and discarded pieces of her previous works. Though she uses mixed media, all of her works are on canvas and employ a "painting language."  Inspired by works done by an African-American artist, Romare Bearden, Tschabalala Self creates collages of various items that she has collected over time and sews them together to depict black female bodies that "defy the narrow spaces in which they are forced to exist", which she derives from the history behind the African-American struggle and oppression in society. Self reclaims the black female body and portrays them to be free of stereotypes without having to fear being punished. Her goal is to "create alternative narratives around the black body". Much of Self's work uses elements from black culture to construct quilt-like portraits.

Early life
Self was born in 1990 in Harlem.

Education
After graduating from Bard College with a B.A. in 2012, Self completed her M.F.A. in painting and printmaking at the Yale School of Art. Self has also held residencies at the American Academy in Rome, the La Brea Studio, T293 in Naples, Italy, and Red Bull House of Art in Detroit.

Career
Self's first solo show was in 2015 at Schur-Narula in Berlin. In a review of a solo show at Thierry Goldberg gallery in New York in 2016, The New York Times declared, "Ms. Self’s work has great promise, which she is developing." Peter Schjeldahl compared her piece at the New Museum's 2017 "Trigger: Gender as a Tool and a Weapon" to the works of Arshile Gorky and Willem de Kooning. Self's work has also been featured in a solo exhibition at the Parasol unit foundation for contemporary art in London.

Collections 
Self's work is in the permanent collection of Hammer Museum, Los Angeles, California; Pérez Art Museum Miami, Miami, Florida; Rubell Family Collection, Miami, Florida, and the JP Morgan Chase Art Collection.

Self is represented by Pilar Corrias and Galerie Eva Presenhuber.

Artistic style 

Self has said, "I use materials in an unconventional way to subvert the status quo. You don’t have to use paint to make a painting. It aligns with my overall message, which is one of change." The use of unconventional materials help to highlight the unique shapes of a body because it separates the emphasis of each part from the whole structure of the artwork and creates an individual space for the pieces to express rather than to perform for the audience.  Self starts her artwork with a line drawing of the character she wants to illustrate, then takes different objects to create her collage of items to go over that drawing. She uses shapes to build her characters while emphasizing objects or parts of the body that might be noticed first or carry a psychological or physical weight to them.

Several of Self's works are sexually explicit.  Self’s Rainbow piece, which consists of wood, acrylic paint, and other elements, portrays a black woman bending down, exposing her genitalia. Another of Self’s work Swim involves a man and woman joined together in a sexual act while still displaying certain parts of the body that hold more emphasis, in particular, the buttocks. The black female bodies in her artwork are often described as nonbinary or "genderless" because they do not conform to the westernized form of beauty that is usually seen in the art world.

Tschabalala Self's art style revolves around the representation of black women through primary (genitalia) and secondary (body changes/ features) sexual characteristics by painting and utilizing printmaking. In developing her characters, Self exclaims, "The images all start from a drawing. And from that drawing I try to build a body or build the features of the subject I’m creating… I think that they are really sincerely built bit by bit.", the body is made up of several different yet crucial parts which makes the body exaggerations in people complex with layers of racial discrimination and prejudice following along stigmas. Through her art, Self comments upon the normalization and objectification of the
body with a romanticized perspective. The characters illustrated in her artworks all share exaggerated body and facial features, and in doing so, allude to a racial and generational trauma embedded within each painting. The people in her artwork are made from different textures and prints of clothing which emphasize and direct the attention of the audience towards the most significant part in her artwork. Her particular artistic style gravitates towards black women embracing independence and resilience leaving a strong and fierce presence. Self’s approach is most commonly androgynous and does not solely reference one gender.

Works 
One of Self's most prominent works, The Function, sheds light into the social aspect of the art piece and explains the abstract nature of the figure and its background.  Tschabalala states in an interview, “A stereotype is a flat character with two dimensions. And I can confront those stereotypical images by making round, multidimensional characters with complicated desires, inner dialogues, and psychology." The art piece is created by patching together pieces of old paintings, raw canvas, and fabrics which are assembled by stretching, painting and drawing over them. This gives the avatar a greater sense of dimension as it highlights the dynamic motion of turning one’s back indicated by the creased fabric.

Furthermore, Self said in an interview, "My work does not comment on stereotypes and generalizations about the black female body, my practice absorbs these fantasies. The work is celebratory because one must thrive despite destructive rhetoric."

Bodega Run 
Through her project of a series called Bodega Run, Self explores how bodies are affected by their environment, which also impacts the way the bodies move through the world itself. Bodegas are small grocery stores, or also known as liquor stores, that are commonly found on the east coast of America, specifically New York. Self’s inspiration for this project stems from her hometown of Harlem, where bodegas were and are very common. Self, along with many others, believes that bodegas are a place where communities come together that share mutual issues, such as the issue of the oppression of people of color in America. Her Bodega project stems from this belief and her "characters populating the bodegas of Harlem, these groceries of the corner, true microcosms emblems of the black and Latin diasporas in New York". Part of this series is her works she calls Hammer Projects include Rainbow, Big Red, My Guy, Ice Cream, and Loosie in the Park. Self also includes neon light signs, consisting of words such as “Abierto/ Open”, “Coffee/ Teas”, “EBT/ ATM”, and “Lotto”, which represent the LED lights that typically reside in these facilities. As Self has noted in conversation with Jareh Das for Ocula magazine, 'The bodega is an infinitely interesting locale and institution for the various racial, ethnic, and social dynamics at play within these spaces. The mere existence of these stores is deeply radicalized, given the fact that bodegas occupy neighborhoods that are generally defined as food deserts.'

Cotton Mouth 
The body of work presented by Tschabalala Self in her exhibition Cotton Mouth embodies the extraordinary experience of Black American life by connecting Black America’s past to contemporary culture. She does this through the use of “elements in dyed canvas, craft paper, and fabric” in conjunction with other mediums. Self reveals the idea behind the name of this exhibition, explaining that, “Cotton mouth is when you can’t speak with ease, or are coerced into sticking to a script that you didn’t write. Cotton mouth is the reality that you’re in, because of repeated damage”. The choice of title is a burdened one, as a mouth that can no longer function serves as a metaphor for the systemic and continued silencing of Black Americans. Self’s work allows the viewer to contemplate the cultural and historical significance of the labor and sacrifice required of Black Americans to produce cotton itself during the 19th century. Some of Self’s exhibition of paintings, drawings, sculptures and an audio piece in her series Cotton Mouth are known as Spat, Sprewell, Carpet, Nate the Snake, Pocket Rocket, Fast Girl, Lil Mama 2, as well as Loveseat 1, 2, and 3 which are featured in Galerie Eva Presenhuber in New York.

Recognition
Self has been named to Forbes "30 Under 30 List". She has also been recognized as a Joan Mitchell Foundation Painters & Sculptors Grant recipient.

Personal life
Self currently lives in New Haven, Connecticut.

References

External links
 Inside Tschabalala Self’s Complicated, Meteoric Rise through the Art Market by Alina Cohen, Artsy, November 6, 2019
 Studio Visit: Tschabalala Self from Studio Museum of Harlem

1990 births
American women painters
Bard College alumni
People from Harlem
Yale University alumni
Living people
21st-century American women artists
21st-century American painters
Painters from New York City